"Don't Wanna Fall in Love" is a song by Canadian singer-songwriter Jane Child. Released in January 1990 as the second single from her self-titled debut album, the single went to number two for three consecutive weeks on the Billboard Hot 100 from April 14 to April 28, 1990. In addition, a new jack swing remix of the song was produced by Teddy Riley and reached number six on the Billboard Hot Black Singles chart and number eleven on the Billboard Dance Club Play chart.

When released around Europe, it also became successful albeit more modestly. In the UK, the single stalled at number 22 after Child refused to appear on the popular British TV program Top of the Pops while the single was climbing the charts, considering the program to be a "sellout". In April 1990, the single was certified gold by the Recording Industry Association of America for shipping over half a million units.

Writing and composition
Child wrote the song in Los Angeles, after having recently moved from New York City. During the session she was playing bass with one hand and pads with the other while singing. While the groove was coming along, lyrics were following closely. She wrote the entire song in that session, except for the 2nd verse later. The intention of the lyrics were not written as a happy love song, reflecting more so on the pleasure vs pain principle.

Music video
The music video was directed by cinematographer Derek M. Allen and shot in New York City at the request of Child, due to having written the song while living there. Shot in both black-and-white and color, the video shows Child walking through downtown Manhattan at night, alternating with scenes of the artist at work, singing into a studio microphone, laying down tracks on a Fairlight and mixing the results on a multitrack board. In several scenes, Child wears a Toronto Maple Leafs jersey, paying homage to her hometown.

Track listings

Charts

Weekly charts

Year-end charts

Certifications

Release history

See also
 List of 1990s one-hit wonders in the United States

References

External links
 
 

1989 songs
1990 singles
Jane Child songs
Juno Award for Dance Recording of the Year recordings
New jack swing songs
Warner Records singles